The First Stresemann cabinet (German: Erstes Kabinett Stresemann) was the eighth democratically elected Reichsregierung of the German Reich, during the period in which it is now usually referred to as the Weimar Republic. The cabinet was named after Reichskanzler (chancellor) Gustav Stresemann and took office on 13 August 1923 when it replaced the Cuno cabinet under Wilhelm Cuno. The cabinet resigned late on 3 October 1923 and was replaced on 6 October by another cabinet formed by Stresemann.

Establishment
The resignation of the Cuno cabinet was officially transmitted to Reichspräsident Friedrich Ebert late on 12 August 1923. At roughly the same time, Ebert asked the chairman of the DVP, Gustav Stresemann, to form a new government. On the evening of 13 August, Ebert appointed Stresemann Chancellor. At that point, the list of ministers for the new cabinet was mostly completed. This was the fastest formation of a government between the time when the Weimar National Assembly was replaced by the Reichstag in 1920 and the period of the "presidential cabinets" in 1930. The first cabinet meeting took place on 14 August, within 36 hours of the resignation of Cuno.

Stresemann's cabinet was based on the Große Koalition (grand coalition) of DVP, Social Democrats (SPD), Zentrum and German Democratic Party (DDP). There was no coalition agreement and the government declaration of 14 August did not offer a political program. The most pressing tasks for the government were stabilizing the currency and solving the related problem of the occupied territories. After the Occupation of the Ruhr by French and Belgian troops in January 1923, the Cuno government had increasingly resorted to the printing presses to finance the extra spending and replace the loss of tax revenue caused by "passive resistance" against the occupation. As a result, the already high rate of inflation had spiked. By the summer, the resulting collapse of the Mark in the currency markets had led to shortages of foreign currencies to pay for vital food imports.

Overview of the members
The members of the cabinet were as follows:

Notes: Stresemann kept the Auswärtiges Amt and thus was his own foreign minister. The Reichsministerium für die besetzten Gebiete, responsible for the territories occupied by France and Belgium, was created by presidential order on 24 August 1923. However, Fuchs was appointed acting head of the yet-to-be created ministry on 13 August 1923. Since the cabinet resigned at 11:30 p.m. on 3 October the end of its tenure is sometimes given as 4 October or 6 October, when Stresemann's reshuffled second cabinet took office.

Four of the cabinet members were not members of the Reichstag: Hilferding, Fuchs, Oeser and Luther.

Resignation

From 15 August to 27 September, the Reichstag was not in session. During that time, the government relied on Article 48 of the constitution which allowed the Reichspräsident to issue emergency decrees.

In the cabinet meeting of 30 September, the government discussed the necessity of a further transfer of power from parliament to the cabinet. In particular, the situation in Bavaria — which was moving towards a right-wing dictatorship under Staatskommissar von Kahr — gave rise to concern over the unity of the Reich. Several cabinet members argued in favour of a farreaching independence of the government from the political parties. However, the Reichstag fractions refused to cooperate. The first Stresemann government resigned over their diverging views on the range of powers that should be granted to the cabinet. There was consensus on the need to put an extra burden both on wealth and on workers, by extending working hours from the current norm of an eight-hour workday and a six-day working week (seven hours in the crucial coal industry). However, the extent and manner of boosting working hours was controversial.

On 1 October, the cabinet agreed on the need for an Ermächtigungsgesetz that would give the government wide-ranging powers not just in the financial and economic sphere but also in increasing working hours in "vital" industries. However, the next day the party leaders clashed on this issue. Hermann Müller, chairman of the SPD, with an eye towards the unions and political competition from the Communists, argued against this. Ernst Scholz of the DVP by contrast demanded a decree raising working hours in addition to including the right-wing DNVP in the government.

On the evening of 2 October, the increase in the working day was included in the government proclamation, whilst the Ermächtigungsgesetz would be limited to "financial and economic" issues - with the understanding that the latter would encompass "social" measures. The Reichstag fraction of the SPD refused to agree and insisted on the parliament's involvement in changes to working hours. DDP and Zentrum were willing to go along with this. Luther and Gessler were opposed, with the latter arguing against the asymmetry of "burdening wealth by decree, but the working class only by law". Stresemann tried and failed to win agreement from his party. As a result, the cabinet resigned late on 3 October. It was followed by a reshuffled cabinet, led once again by Stresemann, on 6 October.

References

Stresemann I
1923 establishments in Germany
Cabinets established in 1923
Cabinets disestablished in 1923
Stresemann I